The Nigerien's Movement for Justice (in French Mouvement des Nigériens pour la justice, MNJ) is a largely Tuareg ethnic, northern Niger based militant group. But the MNJ also includes other nomadic ethnicities, within this area, such as the Toubou and the Fulani have also joined the group, which has been battling the Niger government since 2007.

The MNJ wants a greater share of the revenues from northern Niger's uranium wealth to be invested in the region.  Niger is one of the top five uranium producers in the world.  It is also one of the bottom five poorest countries on earth. The MNJ also want a restriction of the area that will be affected by the expansion of the uranium mines, to protect the space they need to raise their animals.

The Niger government has dismissed the MNJ as "bandits" and "drug-smugglers", and turned the northern half of the country into a closed military zone under curfew and military law suspending certain freedoms.  Journalists are strictly prohibited from covering the rebellion.

Events
MNJ has claimed a series of attacks on the Nigerien Military and foreign economic interests since February 2007. The organization has taken responsibility for attacks which have killed 45 people and seized several Nigerien soldiers. In 2008, the MNJ claimed to have some 3,500 fighters, many of them defectors from the Nigerien military.

In June 2007, the MNJ attacked northern Niger's main airport at Agadez and overran an army outpost in the Aïr Mountains taking over 70 Nigerien soldiers prisoner.

On 6 July 2007, the MNJ kidnapped a Chinese nuclear engineer working for China Nuclear Engineering and Construction Corps, holding him for about 10 days until releasing him to the Red Cross. The company had been prospecting for uranium for some time in Teguidan Tessoumt in cooperation with the Niger government, and MNJ wanted them to cease their operations.

On 22 June 2008, the MNJ kidnapped four employees of Areva, the French state nuclear corporation which has been exploiting northern Niger's uranium for over forty years. The French nationals were released to the Red Cross three days later.

Leaders
The MNJ is led by  Aghaly ag Alambo, a former member of the Front de libération de l'Aïr et de l'Azawagh (FLAA), and Mohamed Acharif, a former captain in the Nigerien Armed Forces who defected to the rebels in May 2007.

Aghaly Alambo, from Iferouane in northern Niger, was apparently inspired by the Mali based Tuareg group May 23, 2006 Democratic Alliance for Change (Mai 23, 2006 Alliance démocratique pour le changement - ADC), ex-combatants who led a short campaign in the north of Mali from May to July 2006, when they signed a peace deal with the Bamako government.  In late March 2008, the ADC restarted its armed uprising against the Mali government.

See also
Tuareg rebellion (2007–2009)
Azawagh
Revolutionary Armed Forces of the Sahara (FARS)
 La Mort de la gazelle

References

 6. (Italian) Parla Aghaly Alambo,  Cristiano Tinazzi, Left: 12 ottobre 2007
Al Jazeera English Special Coverage Page: Unrest in the Sahara
The Niger Movement for Justice (Mouvement des Nigériens pour la justice, MNJ) Press site.: three to ten communiqués a week have been posted since April 2007

External links
IRIN - humanitarian news and analysis with frequent reports on the situation in northern Niger
 (French) The Niger Movement for Justice (Mouvement des Nigériens pour la justice, MNJ) Press site.: three to ten communiqués a week have been posted since April 2007
Reputed press site of the  ALLIANCE TOUAREGUE NIGER-MALI: created 31 August 2007
Reuters/alertnet.org: Articles on Niger-Mali Tuareg unrest

Rebel groups in Niger
Guerrilla organizations
History of Niger
Niger Movement for Justice
2000s in Niger
Organizations established in 2007
2007 establishments in Niger